Lasiacis ligulata is a species of grass found in the Caribbean and Tropical South America.

Taxonomy
Lasiacis ligulata was described by Albert Spear Hitchcock and Mary Agnes Chase in 1917. The type specimen was collected in Trinidad, between bushes by a stream.

Description

Lasiacis ligulata is a perennial, tuft-forming plant with rambling or climbing, woody culms that grow 1–5 m long and 6–13 mm thick. Leaf-blades are lanceolate, 7–14 cm long and 10–22 mm wide. The inflorescence is a 2–17 cm long panicle with individual spikelets containing one basal, sterile floret and one fertile floret.

Distribution
The species is found from the Caribbean to northern and western South America, including Brazil.

References

Panicoideae
Plants described in 1917